In statistical mechanics of continuous systems, a potential for a many-body system is called H-stable (or simply stable) if the potential energy per particle is bounded below by a constant that is independent of the total number of particles. In many circumstances, if a potential is not H-stable, it is not possible to define a grand canonical partition function in finite volume, because of catastrophic configurations with infinite particles located in a finite space.

Classical statistical mechanics

Definition
Consider a system of particles in positions ; the interaction or potential between a particle in position  and a particle in position  is 

where  is a real,  even (possibly unbounded)  function. Then  is H-stable if there exists  such that,  for any  and any ,

Applications
 If  and, for every  and every , it holds

then the potential  is stable (with the constant  given by ). This condition applies for example to potentials that are: a) positive functions; b) positive-definite functions.

 is convergent. In fact, for bounded, upper-semi-continuous potentials the hypothesis is not only sufficient, but also necessary!

The grand canonical partition function, in finite volume, is

hence the H-stability is a sufficient condition for the partition function to exists in finite volume.

 H-stability doesn't  necessary imply the existence of the infinite volume pressure. For example, in a Coulomb system (in dimension three) the potential is

and, if the charges of all the particles are equal, then the potential energy is

 If the potential is not bounded, H-stability is not a necessary condition for the existence of the grand canonical partition function in finite volume. For example, in the case  of Yukawa interaction in two dimensions,

if the particles can have charges with different signs, the potential  energy is

Quantum statistical mechanics
The notion of H-stability in quantum mechanics is more subtle. 
While in the classical case the kinetic part of the Hamiltonian is not important as it can be zero independently of the position of the particles, in the quantum case the kinetic term plays an important role in the lower bound for the total energy because of the uncertainty principle. (In fact, stability of matter was the historical reason for introducing such a principle in mechanics.)
The definition of stability is :

 

where E0 is the ground state energy.

Classical H-stability implies quantum H-stability, but the converse is false.

The criterion is especially useful in statistical mechanics, where H-stability is necessary to the existence of thermodynamics, i.e. if a system is not H-stable, the thermodynamic limit does not exist.

References

 J.L. Lebowitz and Elliott H. Lieb   (Physical Review Letters, 1969)

Statistical mechanics
Potentials